Bozel (Arpitan Savoyard: Bosél or Bozél) is a commune in the Savoie department in the Auvergne-Rhône-Alpes region in Southeastern France. In 2019, it had a population of 1,876.

Bozel has one surface ski lift and a green run. It has 19 km of cross-country trails.

In the course of the French Revolution, it was briefly renamed Fructidor.

Gallery

See also
Communes of the Savoie department

References

External links

Official site

Communes of Savoie